The following is a list of notable events and releases of the year 2011 in Norwegian music.

Events

January
 26 – The very first Bodø Jazz Open started in Bodø (January 26–29).
 28
 Nordlysfestivalen started in Tromsø (January 28 – February 5).
 Marit Sandvik (vocals) was awarded the Nordlysprisen 2011 at Nordlysfestivalen.

February
 3 – The Polarjazz Festival 2011 started in Longyearbyen (February 3 – 7).
 9 – Kristiansund Opera Festival opened (February 9 – 20).

March

April
 15 – Vossajazz starts in Voss (April 15–17).
 16
 Mari Kvien Brunvoll was awarded Vossajazzprisen 2011.
 Mathias Eick performs the commissioned work Voss at Vossajazz
 27
 Bergenfest 2011 started in Bergen (April 27 – May 1).
 SoddJazz 2011 started in Inderøy, Nord-Trøndelag (April 27 – May 1).

May
 25
 The start of Bergen International Music Festival Festspillene i Bergen (May 25 – June 6).
 Nattjazz starts in Bergen (May 25 – June 4).
 29 – Jacob Koranyi was awarded the Norwegian Soloist Prize 2011 during Festspillene i Bergen.

June
 9 – Norwegian Wood 2011 started in Oslo, Norway (June 9 – 13).

July
 18 – Moldejazz starts in Molde (July 18–23).

August
10 – Sildajazz starts in Haugesund (August 10–14).
12 – Marius Neset is awarded the Sildajazzprisen 2011.
 15 – Oslo Jazzfestival started (August 15 – 20).

September
 1 – Punktfestivalen started in Kristiansand (September 1 – 3).
 15 – The Ekkofestival started in Bergen (September 23 – October 1).

October
 20 – The Insomnia Festival started in Tromsø (October 20 – 22).
 27 – Marius Neset performs at 'Nasjonal Jazzscene' with the band 'Marius Neset Golde Xplosion' as part of the award 'jazZtipendiat' 2011, including with Magnus Hjort (piano), Peter Eldh (bass), and Martin France (drums).

November
 2 – The Oslo World Music Festival started in Oslo, Norway (November 2 – 6).
 9 – The Vardø Blues Festival (Blues i Vintermørket) started (November 9 – 13).
 17 – The 6th Barents Jazz, Tromsø International Jazz Festival started (November 17 – 20).

December
 11 – The Nobel Peace Prize Concert was held at Telenor Arena.
 18 – Eldbjørg Raknes was awarded the 2011 Buddyprisen

Albums released

January

February
 7 – Glossolalia by Sigbjørn Apeland (Hubro Music)
 18 – Viscera by Jenny Hval (Rune Grammofon)

March
 11
 Elastics by Ole Mathisen, Per Mathisen and Paolo Vinaccia (Losen Records).
 Uleste Bøker Og Utgåtte Sko by Oslo Ess
 18 – Jeg Vil Hjem Til Menneskene by Susanna Wallumrød (performs lyrics by Gunvor Hofmo)
 25
 For Flowers, Cars And Merry Wars by Huntsville
 La Alarmane Gå by Honningbarna

April
 4 – The Shining Of Things by Hanne Boel
 8 – Roadwork Vol. 4 – Intrepid Skronk by Motorpsycho
 8 – Early Piano Music by Ketil Bjørnstad
 15
 Golden Xplosion by Marius Neset
 Lysøen – Hommage À Ole Bull by Nils Økland / Sigbjørn Apeland
 A Day at The Opera by Ivar Antonsen (Ponca Jazz Records).
 19 – Pressure by Splashgirl

May
 24 – Sounds and Sights by In The Country

June
 15 – Nord by Tore Johansen, with guest Odd Børretzen reciting ”Nord” by Rolf Jacobsen

July
 31 – Release of Tension by Jostein Gulbrandsen Trio.

August
 19 – Ha! by Humcrush with Sidsel Endresen
 22 – Splashgirl/Huntsville: Split by Splashgirl/Huntsville

September
 2 – SkyDive by Mats Eilertsen
 16 – The Attic by Hayden Powell
 17 – How High is the Sky by Kjersti Stubø (Bolage).
 23
 Shoot! by Hedvig Mollestad Trio
 Yr by Ragnhild Hemsing (Simax Classics)
 30
 Liarbird by Ola Kvernberg (Jazzland Recordings), the commissioned work, live from Moldejazz 2010.
 Fine Together by Roger Johansen feat. Georg Riedel

October
 10 – Blackwood by Bjørn Berge
 14 – Ingen Hverdag by Valkyrien Allstars
 14 – Alle Skal Få by Stian Around A Hill (Omenås)
 21 – Yonkers by Albatrosh
 21 – The Coarse Sand & The Names We Wrote by Jon Eberson Group

November
 9 – Live at the BBC by Elephant9
 11 – Alle Snakker Sant by Siri Nilsen
 11 – Unemployed by Alog
 18 – Here Comes Everybody by Atomic.
 21 – Scent Of Soil by Scent Of Soil

December
 2
 Songs by Bugge Wesseltoft (Jazzland Recordings)
 Stillness by Hildegunn Øiseth (Losen Records)

Unknown date
#

F
 Gabriel Fliflet: Åresong

J
 JøKleBa: Jøkleba! / Nu Jøk?

M
 Mural: Live At The Rothko Chapel with Ingar Zach, Kim Myhr and Jim Denley

W
 Petter Wettre & Audun Kleive: The Only Way To Travel 2

New Artists
 Jonas Alaska received the Spellemannprisen award, as 'Best newcomer of the year 2011', for the album Jonas Alaska and was with that also recipient of the Gramo grant.
 Hanna Paulsberg Concept was awarded the 2011 'Young Nordic Jazz Comets' by the Scandinavian Jazz Associations at the Jazz club Fasching in Stockholm, September 10, 2011.

Deaths

 January
 24 – Audun Tylden, record producer (born 1948)

February
 3 – Eline Nygaard Riisnæs, classical pianist and musicologist (born 1913).

April
 10 – Børt-Erik Thoresen, television host and folk singer (born 1932).
 22 – Eyvind Solås, classical pianist, composer, actor, and program host (born 1937).
 24 – Dag Stokke, rock keyboarder, TNT, church organist and mastering engineer, cancer (born 1967).

May
 31 – Sølvi Wang, pop and folk singer and actress (born 1929).

July
 2 – Paul Weeden, American-born jazz guitarist (born 1923)
 24 – Harald Johnsen, bassist, heart attack, (born 1970).

September
 4 – Hilde Heltberg, pop and folk singer songwriter, cancer (born 1959).

 December
 1 – Siss Hartmann, pop and musical singer (born 1934)

See also
 2011 in Norway
 Music of Norway
 Norway in the Eurovision Song Contest 2011

References

 
Norwegian music
Norwegian
Music
2010s in Norwegian music